David Smit (born 23 July 1976) is an English cricketer.  Smit is a right-handed batsman.  He was born at Nottingham, Nottinghamshire. He was schooled at Nottingham High School.

Smit represented the Derbyshire Cricket Board in a single List A cricket.  His debut List A match came against Wales Minor Counties in the 1999 NatWest Trophy.  Between 1999 and 2002, he represented the Board in 5 List A matches, with his final match coming against the Middlesex Cricket Board in the 1st round of the 2003 Cheltenham & Gloucester Trophy which was played in 2002.  In his 5 List A matches, he scored 94 runs at a batting average of 18.80, with a high score of 38.  In the field he took 3 catches.

He currently plays club cricket for Ilkeston Rutland Cricket Club in the Derbyshire Premier Cricket League.

Family
His sister Jane represented England women in 21 Women's Tests and 109 Women's One Day Internationals.

References

External links

1976 births
Living people
Cricketers from Nottingham
English cricketers
Derbyshire Cricket Board cricketers